Jacob White may refer to:

Jacob White (cricketer) (1764–1831), English cricketer
Jacob C. White Jr. (1837–1902), American educator, intellectual, and civil rights activist
Jacob K. White, American computer scientist